The Küçük Mecidiye Mosque is an Ottoman mosque in the Beşiktaş district of Istanbul, Turkey. It was built from the order of Sultan Abdülmecid I by Nigoğos Balyan, member of the Balyan family. The mosque is located on the Çırağan Street near the entrance to the Yıldız Park. Beşiktaş Police Station is located nearby, Çırağan Palace is across the street.

See also
 Islamic architecture
 List of mosques
 Ottoman architecture

References 
 Small mosques, mosque complexes (Külliye) and masjids at Ministry of Culture and Tourism

External links
 Images of Küçük Mecidiye Mosque

Mosques completed in 1848
Ottoman mosques in Istanbul
Nigoğayos Balyan buildings
Beşiktaş
19th-century religious buildings and structures in Turkey